Kinmel Bay Football Club is a Welsh football team based in Kinmel Bay, in Conwy County Borough, north-east Wales.  The team currently play in the North Wales Coast East Football League Premier Division, which is at the fourth tier of the Welsh football league system. Currently Kinmel Bay Football Club have a number of teams in both Boys and Girls ages from under 5's to under 16's who all compete In the local junior leagues of Rhyl and District Junior League  and North Wales Girls Football League Kinmel Bay Football Club also have a senior Men's team completing in North Wales Coast East Premier Division for the 2022/23 season. The management team consist of Alex Craig, Leon Field and Andy Thomas. Senior reserve team Currently managed by Darrell Gunther, Harry Woodfine and Jordan Guest. A Senior Ladies Team managed by Georgia Williams, Frank Standing, Kelly Prior and Paul Denton.

History
The club was established in 2002 by Bill Darwin and his sister, Anne Darwin.

In the 2017–18 season the club were champions of the Vale of Clwyd and Conwy Football League Premier Division at the first attempt and were promoted to the Welsh Alliance League Division Two. After the FAW league pyramid restructure in 2019/20 Kinmel Bay F.C. unfortunately did not meet the new criteria set out by the FAW and where forced to return to the North Wales Coast East Premier Division. Kinmel Bay F.C. also have a reserve side who had to leave the FAW Reserve league and return to the newly formed North Wales Coast reserve league.

Honours

Vale of Clwyd and Conwy Football League Premier Division – Champions: 2017–18

External links
official Club Website
Club website
 Club official Twitter
 Club official Facebook

References

2002 establishments in Wales
Association football clubs established in 2002
Football clubs in Wales
Sport in Conwy County Borough
Welsh Alliance League clubs
North Wales Coast Football League clubs
Vale of Clwyd and Conwy Football League clubs